A mine shell (from the German term Minengeschoß, "mine shot"), also known as High-Explosive, High-Capacity (HEHC) in British military nomenclature, is a military explosive shell type characterized by thin (usually steel) shell walls and a correspondingly high quantity of explosives, much higher than the traditional high explosive shell type per caliber, meaning that mine shells trade fragmentation effect (due to the thinner shell walls) for a higher pressure wave effect when comparing to traditional high explosive shells.

Mine shells were originally developed during the mid to late 1800s against fortresses prior to rebar but got a new role during World War II against air targets as reinforced fortresses had made the original use of the type obsolete around World War I.

Effect, construction and use 

The mine shell is a more explosive version of the common high-explosive and high-explosive fragmentation shells, relying on inflicting damage primarily through the blast (pressure wave) alone rather than via the combination of fragmentation and a correspondingly smaller blast achieved by classic high explosive shells. This is referred to as pressure wave effect/damage in for example Swedish. This effect is desirable when attacking non-reinforced materials such as brick, concrete or aircraft skin, as these are relatively brittle and easy to penetrate and therefore do not need to be tackled with heavy, hard projectiles, but are tough enough to maintain their structure despite being pierced by shellfire and fragmentation. The larger explosions generated by mine shells are more efficient at inflicting damage on such targets than the greater kinetic impact but smaller detonations delivered by conventional rounds. To achieve this effect mine shells feature very thin shell walls and thus more room for explosive filler; though at the cost of generating lighter and thus somewhat less formidable shrapnel (fragmentation). Against thicker targets, such as brick or concrete walls, they often also feature a delayed action on the fuze so they can penetrate into the wall and burst inside it, forcing larger pieces of the targets to break loose.

An additional advantage of the mine shell approach is that, with explosives being lighter than metal, the projectiles weigh correspondingly less, which gives them higher muzzle velocity compared to heavier shells. For the same reason, they also generate less recoil. However less desirably, the reduced mass inevitably entails that they will possess less momentum, which reduces their range as velocity falls off more rapidly than in a heavier projectile with more inertia. It is also a consideration that the lower recoil makes them unsuitable to be fired from the same gun as standard shells of comparable power, if it uses a recoil operated or advanced primer ignition mechanism. Mine shells are thus often longer in construction compared to other projectile types of the same caliber to increase the weight with more mass in an attempt to reduce the weight difference, but also to further increase the damage-output.

Name

Meaning 

The word 'mine' in the name "mine shell" can in the modern world seem confusing, as military use of the word is mainly associated with land mines and naval mines. However the word "mine" is very old and originally had the same meaning as "mining mines". As mines were used during siege warfare in past eras to collapse fortifications, and later blowing up fortifications (see tunnel warfare), the first proto-landmines developed received the name mine. These were basic explosives dug down into the ground like a mine. This eventually led to mine-ordnance being defined as "contained explosions", which is alluded to in the name mine shell as its original purpose was to penetrate into fortification walls and burst inside.

However, as mine shells became obsolete against fortresses the definition changed with time from "shells damaging through a contained explosion" to "shells damaging through the shock wave created from the explosion of their payload, rather than the combination of fragmentation and pressure wave damage like traditional high explosive shells, which have thicker shell walls and smaller explosive load".

Spread and use 
The name 'mine shell' in English is a modern term directly translated from the German military term Minengeschoß ("mine shot"). The historical equivalent English military term is High-Explosive, High-Capacity, abbreviated as HEHC, which has become uncommon or obsolete in modern times. The name mine shell is or has however been present in several different military nomenclatures around the world besides Germany and the UK; although in modern times only a few countries still use the term "mine shell" (or equivalent) and its umbrella terms in military nomenclature.

International terms 
Examples of military nomenclatures around the world using the term mine shell or equivalent:
 – English High-Explosive, High-Capacity (HEHC)
 –  and obus fougasse for land based munition According to older French weapons standardization, the term "á mine" was used for landmines buried deeper than 3 meters in the ground, while the term "fougasse" was used for landmines buried less than 3 meters below the ground (see Fougasse (weapon)). This indicates that there probably were differences in effect between 'Obus á mine' and 'Obus fougasse' shells.
 –  (M-gesch) for conventional mine shells or Minenbrandgranate (M-brgr) for incendiary mine shells
 – 
 – 
 – 
 – 
 –  (mingr or mgr)

Other applications 

The damage effect of mine shells, often described as "pressure wave damage" or simply named "mine damage/mine effect", has historically been applied to other types of ordnance than cannon shells, most notably aerial bombs (example names: German: Minenbombe, English: High-Capacity bomb).

Air-to-air rockets configured with mine-shell equivalent warheads have also at times featured "mine" in their name. For example, the German WW2 rocket R4M was an abbreviation of Rakete, 4 Kg, Minenkopf, meaning "Rocket, 4 kg, Mine-head" in English. Interestingly, mine-rockets developed in Sweden after WW2 were named sprängraketer (high-explosive rockets), even though their initial design was directly based on the German R4M.

History 

Dedicated mine shells originate in Europe. The origin of the name "mine shell" is unknown but Italy was using the name by 1884.

Mine shells were used in a lot of different types of high caliber cannons, howitzers and mortars both on land and on water around the turn of the century 1900 before seeing a decline after World War I. (See the article Minenwerfer for the use of mine shells in mortars during World War I.) The use of rebar-reinforced fortifications during World War I probably made the shell obsolete as its effect on fortifications was negated by the rebar.

German use of mine shells in World War II 
During World War II, mine shells would see a resurgence as the Germans started to use the type in small caliber (initially 20 mm) automatic weapons, both to arm the Luftwaffe's fighter aircraft and for Flak. This was an innovation, as prior to this, mine shells had only been constructed in large calibers for technical reasons. Larger shells were usually produced by casting, smaller calibers by drilling the cavity for fuse and explosives into a solid steel shot, and neither process was effective at making small projectiles with walls that were sufficiently thin yet strong enough to work as a mine shell. While small thick-walled shells fired from automatic guns performed well against ground targets, they were more limited in anti-aircraft use.

Development 
In the late 1930s, the Germans began to pay attention to these shortcomings during the trials of the 20 mm MG FF cannon. Its conventional high explosive rounds were judged unsatisfactory in the anti-aircraft role, for the reasons mentioned above. As a result of these trials, the German ministry of air defense "Reichsluftfahrtministerium", or "RLM" for short, ordered the development of mine shells for the 20 mm MG FF cannon in 1937. To make such shells in  caliber, German ordnance engineers had to try new methods of construction; what they came up with was a round made from high quality drawing steel, manufactured in the same way in which cartridge cases are made. These new 20 mm mine shells were first used against the RAF in 1940, and proved highly successful. Even when the British and later, to a limited extent the Americans equipped their fighters with autocannon, they always used conventional ammunition. The difference in payloads between these rounds and the Luftwaffe's mine shells was significant. Considering the high explosive rounds alone as an example: the 20 mm mine shells used in MG-FF/M cannons (and later in the MG 151/20) both had a 17 gm HE filling while British and American WW II autocannon shells of the same calibre, but markedly heavier could carry only 10-12 gm; while the typical filler load in the conventional 20 mm shells of the original MG-FF was a mere 4.5 to 6.5 gm.

As mentioned above, one problem with the new ammunition was that due to their lightweight nature, the new 20 mm mine shells produced insufficient recoil to operate the 20 mm MG FF cannon. This required a modification of the recoil mechanism so the cannon could fire this new shell, but this in turn made it unsafe to fire the old, conventional rounds. In an effort to avoid the chambering of incorrect ammunition, the modified weapon was redesignated the 20 mm MG FF/M, M for Minengeschoß.

Deployment 

Germany first used Minengeschoß ammunition during the Battle of Britain when MG FF/M armed Bf 109E's and Bf 110C's flew missions over from mainland Europe to Britain. Although the shells themselves proved deadly, the guns had a poor rate of fire, relatively sluggish muzzle velocity and an inadequate magazine ammunition feed, and were soon to be replaced by the belt-fed MG 151. This new type was originally introduced as a Minengeschoß-firing heavy machine gun, in 15 mm; but then it was realised that the earlier cannon-sized mine shells were more effective, and so a new larger cartridge (20x82mm) was created for the weapon. The adapted gun, (more precisely designated the MG 151/20), became the Luftwaffe's standard 20 mm autocannon until the end of the war, and with its high fire rate coupled with good ballistics and high explosives payload for its caliber was overall among the best aircraft armament of the conflict.

As the possibilities of this new application for mine shells became better understood, the Luftwaffe found they had created a potential game-changer as the recoil/velocity ratio made it possible to create larger caliber guns that would have low enough recoil to be effectively mounted on conventional aircraft, while at the same time achieving useful velocities. Moreover, as the volume of a cylinder is proportional to the square of its radius, and as cannon shells tend to the shape of a cylinder, the Minengeschoß design when applied to larger calibers allowed a dramatic increase in explosive payload and power. One such weapon was the  MK 108 which became highly militarily significant during the second half of the war, when the Allies began to mount their enormous bombing onslaught on German cities. So large was the increase in internal volume indeed that it proved worthwhile to the Germans to refine these projectiles by making them more streamlined, sacrificing a little of this capacity, but thus partly compensating for the lower momentum characteristic of the Minengeschoß design. These streamlined mine shells for the 30 mm MK 108 were designated Ausf.C. and featured  of nitropenta (PETN), compared to the original blunt-nosed Ausf.A which had  of PETN. (Note that the Ausf.B was a training shell without explosives.) See below for a comparison with modern ammunition loads.

Mine shells where also adopted for use in ground attack cannons like the high-velocity 30 mm MK 103, among others, as well as anti-aircraft guns like the 2 cm Flak 30/38, 3.7 cm Flak 18/36/37/43 and 5 cm FlaK 41.

Further development 

At the end of the WWII the Germans started to develop several autocannons in caliber  for use in aircraft and anti-aircraft guns against allied aircraft. Some examples being the Gerät 58 anti-aircraft gun and the MK 112 and MK 115 aircraft cannons. The reason the Germans settled on an unconventional caliber of 55 mm was due to it being the smallest caliber that could shoot down a heavy bomber with a single mine shell. Due to requirements for minimalism, it was calculated that a caliber of at least  was needed to deliver this load.

In the end no 55 mm mine shells seems to have been deployed by Germany during WWII. The allied bombing of Germany delayed weapons-research and made production of the 55 mm weapons impossible.

It should be noted however that the Germans did manage to deploy a 55 mm air-to-air rocket named "Rakete, 4 Kg, Minenkopf" (Rocket, 4 kg, Mine-head), or R4M for short, at the end of 1944. It was fitted with a 55 mm "high-capacity", or "mine" warhead filled with 520 gram of the explosive-mixture "HTA 41" (also known as "HTA 15"), which consists of 40% Hexogen (RDX), 45% TNT and 15% aluminium. These rockets were fitted to several German aircraft at the end of the war, most notably the Me 262, which used them to great effect during their limited service life. On one occasion, Me 262's armed with R4M rockets, shot down 25 B-17 bombers out of a group of 425 within a very short time without any losses.

Post-war use 

After the defeat of Germany in World War II, several countries started using mine shells for their own post-war aircraft and anti-aircraft armament, for example the "high-explosive" shells of Britain's ADEN cannon and the French DEFA 540 were effectively clones of German wartime equivalents. The guns themselves were developments of the German Mauser MK 213.

Sweden having experience with the shell type from earlier developed several different mine shells in several different calibers after the war. Some examples being a mine shell variant for the 20 x 110 Hispano cartridge and one for the 57 x 230R Bofors cartridge.

The type is still used today in autocannons such as the Mauser BK-27 but there is no known use of the type as it was originally used.

Weapons adapted with mine shells 

Aircraft weapons
20 mm MG FF/M cannon
20 mm MG 151 cannon
20 mm Mauser MG 213
20 mm Hispano-Suiza HS.404
27 mm Mauser BK-27
30 mm MK 101 cannon
30 mm MK 103 cannon
30 mm MK 108 cannon
30 mm Mauser MK 213
30 mm ADEN cannon
30 mm DEFA cannon
30 mm Oerlikon KCA
37 mm BK 3,7
50 mm Rheinmetall BK-5
50 mm MK 214A cannon

Anti-air weapons
2 cm Flak 30, Flak 38 and Flakvierling 38
3.7 cm Flak 18/36/37
3.7 cm Flak 43
5 cm FlaK 41
R4M

Artillery weapons
7.58 cm Minenwerfer
9.15 cm leichtes Minenwerfer System Lanz
17 cm mittlerer Minenwerfer
22.5 cm Minenwerfer M 15
24 cm schwerer LadungsWerfer Ehrhardt
24 cm schwere Flügelminenwerfer IKO
24 cm schwere FlügelMinenWerfer Albrecht
240 mm Trench Mortar
9.45-inch Heavy Mortar
25 cm schwerer Minenwerfer
28 cm howitzer L/10

Notes

See also 
Aircraft of the Battle of Britain

References

Citations

Bibliography 

Forsyth, Robert. JV 44: The Galland Circus. Burgess Hill, West Sussex, UK: Classic Publications 1996. 
 Smith, Anthony G and Gustin, Dr Emmanual. Flying Guns World War II. London: The Crowood Press 2003.

External links 
Books by Anthony G Williams plus articles on aircraft weapons
Luftwaffe Aircraft Gun and Cannon Ammunition of WW II
Description of Rheinmetall-Borsig MK 108 30 mm Cannon and ammunition
Histavia21.net - MUNITIONS D'AVIATION LUFTWAFFE

Large-caliber cartridges